Daniel Kennefick (5 May 1888 – 29 May 1960) was an Irish hurler. He lined out at club level with St Mary's and was also a member of the Cork senior hurling team. His son, Mick Kennefick, also played with Cork and became the youngest All-Ireland-winning captain in 1943.

Honours

Cork
Munster Senior Hurling Championship (1): 1912

References

1888 births
1960 deaths
St Mary's (Shandon) hurlers
Cork inter-county hurlers